St. Vincent is a 2014 American comedy-drama film written, directed, and co-produced by Theodore Melfi. The film stars Bill Murray as the title character and features Melissa McCarthy, Jaeden Lieberher, Naomi Watts, Chris O'Dowd, and Terrence Howard.

The film had its premiere at the 2014 Toronto International Film Festival where it was voted second runner-up for the People's Choice Award. It received a limited theatrical release on October 10, 2014, and expanded to a wide release on October 24. The same day, it was released on Netflix in France. The film was a moderate commercial success, grossing $54.8 million against its $13.5 million budget, and received positive reviews from critics.

Plot
Vincent MacKenna is a retired, grumpy, alcoholic Vietnam War veteran living in Sheepshead Bay, who smokes and gambles regularly. His wife, Sandy, has Alzheimer's and no longer recognizes him, but he poses as a doctor to visit her and does her laundry. Vincent's only close friends are his cat Felix and a pregnant Russian sex worker named Daka. Despite his aggression toward strangers, Vincent has acquaintances who admire and care about him.

Vincent's 30-year-old Chrysler LeBaron  gets hit by a branch felled by his new neighbors' moving van. Maggie Bronstein, a radiology tech in the midst of an acrimonious divorce, and her son Oliver, meet Vincent, who demands payment for the injury. Maggie does her best to provide for Oliver, who is ostracized and bullied at his Catholic school, but is a knowledgeable, friendly boy, warmly welcomed by his new teacher. On his first day at his school, Oliver's phone, wallet, and house keys are stolen by his classmate Robert. Oliver asks Vincent if he can stay at his home until his mother comes home from work. Vincent offers to continue "babysitting" for a fee.

Vincent picks up Oliver daily after school because Maggie often has late shifts. Vincent's ideas of after-school activities involve visits to racetracks and bars. The mismatched pair begin to help each other mature. Vincent teaches Oliver how to defend himself from bullies, resulting in Oliver breaking the nose of a bully who later apologizes and gives back what he stole. Oliver befriends the boy, who introduces himself as Robert. Vincent and Oliver win a high-odds bet on the horses, enabling Vincent to pay off some of his debts. After staff in Sandy's nursing home have told him he is behind on fees and Sandy will be moved, Vincent steals money from Oliver's bank account when his own accounts are overdrawn, and takes it to the racetrack. He gambles this money away hoping for a big win.

Vincent is confronted in his home by loan sharks Zucko and Antwan who attempt to take Sandy's jewelry. Vincent suddenly falls to the ground, and Zucko and Antwan leave him on the floor. Oliver finds him and calls emergency services. Vincent is hospitalized, told he has had a stroke, and has to undergo physical therapy. Oliver, Maggie, and Daka help Vincent recover, but his language remains stilted.

Oliver's father, a lawyer, finds out about Vincent and uses the information on gambling, introducing Oliver to a prostitute, etc. to get joint custody with Maggie. Having been unaware of Vincent’s activities, Maggie tells Vincent that he can no longer see Oliver.

Vincent becomes depressed after finding out that Sandy died while he was hospitalized. He is given a box containing her few belongings, and her ashes.

For his "Saints Among Us" school project, Oliver asks around the neighborhood about Vincent's past. Later, he nominates Vincent at the school's assembly, publicly declaring him “St. Vincent of Sheepshead Bay” and presenting him with a medal. Oliver's rationale comes from his teacher's definition of sainthood as a person showing 'commitment and dedication' and some sacrifice. Vincent fits this in terms of his wife; he also saved two fellow soldiers during the Vietnam War. The rest seems debatable, as gambling and theft don't seem the best course of action to raise money for nursing home fees. However, the school audience is impressed by Oliver's speech and applaud Vincent, who has been tricked into attending the event by Daka.

Some time later, Daka gives birth to a baby girl and she, along with Maggie, Oliver and Robert, go to Vincent's house, where they eat and happily talk.

Cast
Bill Murray as Vincent MacKenna, Maggie and Oliver's neighbor.
Jaeden Martell (credited as Jaeden Lieberher) as Oliver Bronstein, Maggie's son.
Melissa McCarthy as Maggie Bronstein, Oliver's mother.
Naomi Watts as Daka Parimova, a pregnant Russian sex worker and Vincent's friend later 2nd wife.
Chris O'Dowd as Brother Geraghty, Oliver's teacher, an Irish priest.
Terrence Howard as Zucko, Vincent's loan shark.
Dario Barosso as Robert Ocinski, Oliver's classmate who bullies him and later becomes his friend.
Donna Mitchell as Sandy MacKenna, Vincent's wife who has Alzheimer's disease.
Kimberly Quinn as Ana, a nurse at Sandy's nursing home.
Scott Adsit as David Bronstein, Maggie's ex-husband and Oliver's father.
Ann Dowd as Shirley, Sandy's nursing home director.
Ron McLarty as Principal O'Brien, Oliver's school principal.
Nate Corddry as Terry, a bank clerk.
Lenny Venito as Coach Mitchell, Oliver's P.E. teacher.
Ray Iannicelli as Roger, a bartender
Maria Elena Ramirez as Amelda, a Latina nanny
Emma Fisher as Bridgette

Production
The screenplay, originally titled St. Vincent de Van Nuys, was written in 2011 by Melfi, and was included on the Hollywood Black List (the best unproduced scripts) of 2011.

Jack Nicholson was rumored to star in the film, but Murray signed on in July 2012. On March 11, 2013, Melissa McCarthy was offered the lead female part and joined the cast. On March 22, Chris O'Dowd joined the cast as a Catholic priest. Naomi Watts joined the cast on April 22 in the role of a Russian prostitute. On July 19, Scott Adsit joined the cast to play McCarthy's character's ex-husband.

Filming
Filming began the first week of July 2013, with scenes filmed in Brooklyn, New York and at Belmont Park in Elmont, Long Island, New York.

Music
On December 26, 2013, Theodore Shapiro was hired to score the film. Sony Classical Records released the soundtrack album on October 27, 2014.

Marketing
The first official trailer for the film was released on July 1, 2014.

Release
The Weinstein Company released the film on October 10, 2014, in limited engagements, before making an expansion into wide release on October 24, 2014.

Reception
On Rotten Tomatoes, the film holds an approval rating of 77% based on 193 reviews, with an average rating of 6.8/10. The consensus reads, "St. Vincent offers the considerable pleasure of seeing Bill Murray back in funny form, but drifts into dangerously sentimental territory along the way." On Metacritic, the film has a weighted average score of 64 out of 100 based on 40 reviews, indicating "generally favorable reviews". Audiences polled by CinemaScore gave the film an average grade of "A−" on an A+ to F scale.

Richard Roeper gave the film a grade of "A", saying Murray's performance could "mean a Golden Globe".

Accolades

References

External links

2014 films
2014 comedy-drama films
American comedy-drama films
Films about grieving
Films about prostitution in the United States
Films about widowhood
Films directed by Theodore Melfi
Films produced by Peter Chernin
Films set in Brooklyn
Films set in New York City
Films shot in New York (state)
Films shot in New York City
Films about gambling
Films scored by Theodore Shapiro
Chernin Entertainment films
Films about veterans
Films about father–son relationships
Films about mother–son relationships
2010s English-language films
2010s American films